Grand County Public Library is a library in Moab, Utah. Its only branch library is the Castle Valley Library.

History
The issue of building a library was brought up in a 1911 Citizens' mass convention. The county decided to build one.

The library was completed in 1915. Then, in 1935, it moved again, to the high school. In 1967, the library burned down. The townsfolk helped rescue hundreds of books. After the fire, the library moved yet again.

The library was named the best small library in the USA of 2007 in Library Journal.

The library has had a library cat called Cosmo since 2018, who features on library publications and even has a feature Cosmo's Corner in the Moab Sun News where the library features new services.

Collections
The library houses books, DVDs, eBooks, audiobooks, puzzles, newspapers and magazines. The library service has used the Koha ILS since 2012.

In particular staff have noted that audiobooks are particularly popular with their community as local people tend to drive long distances across the remote areas.

References

External links
 Utah Public Libraries
 Grand Valley Times | 1911-10-20 | A Library for Moab
 Grand Valley Times | 1915-10-15 | Funds Raised to Purchase Library Site
 Times Independent | 1934-11-22 | Library Will be Moved to Old High School Building
 Times Independent | 1967-05-18 | Historic Library Bows to Flames
 Times Independent | 1967-01-12 | Commissioners Allocate Library Building Funds
 Times Independent | 1968-08-29 | new Library Opens Here Friday

Libraries in Utah
Moab, Utah
Library buildings completed in 1915
1915 establishments in Utah